Gregory Eamon O'Connor (born 12 May 1958) is a New Zealand Labour Party politician and former police officer.  He is the Deputy Speaker of the New Zealand House of Representatives, and has served as the Member of Parliament for Ōhāriu since the 2017 general election.

Early life
O'Connor was born in the Buller District on the West Coast before moving to Wellington. His parents were Eamon O'Connor and Kathleen Moriarty. His father was a trained priest and dairy farmer in Waimangaroa and at the 1978 and 1981 general elections he was the Social Credit Party candidate for the West Coast electorate. His family are Irish Catholic with New Zealand roots in Westport, and O'Connor stated that "growing up there's a fairly healthy disrespect for the law" where he grew up.

Police career
O'Connor served in the New Zealand Police for almost four decades ending his career with the rank of Senior Sergeant. In his maiden speech as an MP, he reflected on undercover operations he'd taken part in "armed with a new identity—a black leather jacket, a beard, long hair, and earrings."

He was later elected president of the New Zealand Police Association in 1995. The Police Association is the union that represents constabulary officers and Police employees. O'Connor's time as president was highly politicised; O'Connor would contribute to political debates on policing issues, particularly in regards to arming officers with firearms. O'Connor called for arming the police in New Zealand and also proposed routine arming of frontline response police officers. He retired as president in October 2016, serving a record 21 years as the Police Association's head and regarded raising the Police Association's credibility as his main achievement during his tenure.

He also spent time serving as the chair of the International Council of Police Representatives Association (ICPRA).

Political career

Upon his retirement from the Police Association in 2016, O'Connor was asked whether he was considering a career in politics, but he said he had no plans to do so at that time.

O'Connor was confirmed as Labour's Ōhāriu candidate on 12 February. His candidacy and selection surprised some (it was reported he had been granted a waiver of the requirement to be a Labour member for 12 months before seeking a nomination) and was criticised on the left-wing blog The Standard. O'Connor replied that Labour was the "natural choice" for him. Dunne withdrew from the election shortly before the election and O'Connor defeated National list MP Brett Hudson to win the seat by a margin of 1,051 votes.

In his first term of Parliament, O'Connor was a member of the Justice (2017–2020), Social Services and Community (2017–2018) and Finance and Expenditure (2019–2020) select committees. In July 2020 O'Connor was criticised for complaining about the reduction in MPs' salaries that was made in solidarity with other pay cuts and job losses in the early days of the COVID-19 pandemic.

During the 2020 New Zealand general election, O'Connor retained Ohāriu by a final margin of 11,961 votes. After the election he was appointed chairperson of the Transport and Infrastructure Committee (2020–2022) and as a member of the Finance and Expenditure Committee (2020–2022). With National MP Melissa Lee he is co-chair of the New Zealand/South and South East Asia Parliamentary Friendship Group. O'Connor's member's bill, the Child Protection (Child Sex Offender Government Agency Registration) (Overseas Travel Reporting) Amendment Bill which extends sex-offender travel reporting rules to overseas trips, passed its first reading on 3 August 2022.

In early August 2022, he briefly held office as a temporary Assistant Speaker of the House of Representatives to cover absences. On 25 August 2022, he was elected Deputy Speaker of the House of Representatives, succeeding Adrian Rurawhe who was elected Speaker the day prior.

Political views 
As Police Association president, O'Connor advocated for arming frontline police officers, although as he left the role he acknowledged that most police would be happy not needing to be armed. Like most MPs, he voted in favour of stricter gun control laws after the Christchurch mosque shootings. He supported the End of Life Choice Bill and first reading of the Abortion Legislation Bill in 2019, but changed his vote to oppose the Abortion Legislation Bill at the second and third readings in 2020.

Personal life
O'Connor lives in Wellington with his wife Desley. They have three children Isaac, Michael, and Evie. His cousin is Damien O'Connor, MP for West Coast-Tasman.

References

Living people
1958 births
New Zealand police officers
New Zealand Labour Party MPs
Members of the New Zealand House of Representatives
Candidates in the 2017 New Zealand general election
New Zealand MPs for Wellington electorates
Candidates in the 2020 New Zealand general election
New Zealand people of Irish descent